The 2019–20 season was the 121st in Athletic Club’s history and the 89th in the top tier.

The season marks the first since the 2006–07 without Markel Susaeta who departed to Gamba Osaka in the summer and the first since 2007–08 without Ander Iturraspe who departed to RCD Espanyol in the same summer.

Squad
According to the official website.

Player statistics
Includes the 2020 Copa del Rey Final, delayed until April 2021 and counted in the 2020–21 season in some resources – the match article has specifics of each player's involvement.

Disciplinary record
Includes the 2020 Copa del Rey Final, delayed until April 2021 and counted in the 2020–21 season in some resources – the match article has specifics of each player's involvement.

From the youth system

Transfer
In

Out

Staff
According to the official website:

Pre-season and friendlies

Competitions

Overview

La Liga

League table

Results summary

Results by round

Matches

Copa del Rey

Semi-finals

Final

References

Athletic Bilbao seasons
Athletic Bilbao